LHW may refer to:

 Lanzhou Zhongchuan International Airport, serving Lanzhou, Gansu, China
 The Leading Hotels of the World, an American hotel affiliation group 
 Light heavyweight, a weight class in boxing
 Light heavyweight (MMA), a weight class in mixed martial arts
 MidCoast Regional Airport at Wright Army Airfield, in Georgia, United States